The following lists events that happened during the year 2001 in Bosnia and Herzegovina.

Incumbents
Presidency:
Halid Genjac (until March 30), Beriz Belkić (starting March 30)
Ante Jelavić (until March 7), Jozo Križanović (starting March 7)
Živko Radišić 
Prime Minister: 
 until February 22: Martin Raguž
 February 22-July 18: Božidar Matić 
 starting July 18: Zlatko Lagumdžija

 
Years of the 21st century in Bosnia and Herzegovina
2000s in Bosnia and Herzegovina
Bosnia and Herzegovina
Bosnia and Herzegovina